This is a list of electoral results for the electoral district of East Melbourne in Victorian state elections.

Members for East Melbourne

  = by-election
  = resigned

Election results

Elections in the 1920s

Elections in the 1910s

References

Victoria (Australia) state electoral results by district